The 2013–14 UNC Wilmington Seahawks men's basketball team represented the University of North Carolina Wilmington during the 2013–14 NCAA Division I men's basketball season. The Seahawks, led by fourth year head coach Buzz Peterson, played their home games at the Trask Coliseum and were members of the Colonial Athletic Association. They finished the season 9–23, 3–13 in CAA play to finish in last place. They lost in the first round of the CAA tournament to Hofstra.

On March 11, UNCW fired head coach Buzz Peterson after a four year record of 42–80.

Roster

Schedule

|-
!colspan=9 style="background:#006666; color:#FFFF66;"| Exhibition

|-
!colspan=9 style="background:#006666; color:#FFFF66;"| Regular season

|-
!colspan=9 style="background:#006666; color:#FFFF66;"| 2014 CAA tournament

References

UNC Wilmington Seahawks men's basketball seasons
UNC Wilmington